Parchaiyan is a Pakistani drama television series presented by the PTV network. It was the first Pakistani drama series in colour. 

It was translated and adapted by the writer Haseena Moin and directed by Mohsin Ali and Shirin Khan.

Parchaiyan was an adaptation of the Henry James novel The Portrait of a Lady. The ensemble cast featured Rahat Kazmi, Sahira Kazmi, Shakeel, Talat Hussain, Khursheed Shahid, Azra Sherwani, Begum Khursheed Mirza, Mohammad Yousaf.

Plot
The story revolves around Najia (Sahira Kazmi) and the men in her life. After passing away of Najia's parents, her mother's sister takes her to her house where she encounters her cousin Adeel (Rahat Kazmi) and his friend Masood (Shakeel). Due to her dynamic personality and beauty, Masood instantly falls for her and shows his intentions to marry her but Najia refuses. On the other hand, she is not aware of the love Adeel has in his heart for her. Through a distant acquaintance of the family, she is introduced to Shiraz (Talat Hussain) who wins her hand despite the fact that he is only interested in her money. When Najia finally leaves Shiraz to return to Adeel, who has blood cancer, she finds that he is on the verge of death.

Cast
Sahira Kazmi
Rahat Kazmi
Shakeel 
Khursheed Shahid
Talat Hussain
Begum Khursheed Mirza
Azra Sherwani
Lubna Aslam
Mehar Rizvi
Mohammad Yousaf
Javed Sheikh (Cameo)

References

Pakistani drama television series
Pakistan Television Corporation original programming
Television shows set in Karachi
Urdu-language television shows